Elatobia montelliella is a moth of the family Tineidae. It is found in Finland, as well as North America where has been recorded from Alberta and Utah.

The wingspan is 16–22 mm.

References

Moths described in 1951
Tineinae
Moths of Europe
Moths of North America